This is a list of the Sites of Special Scientific Interest (SSSIs) in the Vale of Glamorgan Area of Search (AoS).

Sites

References

Vale of Glamorgan
Vale of Glamorgan